Jack-Wabbit and the Beanstalk is a 1943 Warner Bros. cartoon in the Merrie Melodies series, directed by Friz Freleng and starring Bugs Bunny, with all of the voices provided by Mel Blanc. It is a parody of the fairy tale "Jack and the Beanstalk". It should not be confused with Beanstalk Bunny (1955), another parody of this story starring Bugs Bunny, Daffy Duck, and Elmer Fudd.

Mel Blanc is uncredited in the voicing of Bugs Bunny and the Giant. Jack Bradbury is credited as the animator, but other animators on the film were Gerry Chiniquy, Gil Turner, Richard Bickenbach, Manuel Perez, Phil Monroe and Lloyd Turner.

Plot
The film opens as if it is Jack and the Beanstalk, and finds Warner's famous "jackrabbit" (Bugs), already in the giant's lofty realm, chopping down gigantic carrots. It turns out they belong to a dim-witted giant.

The giant is incensed at Bugs invading his "victory garden" and Bugs spends most of the rest of the film trying to elude the giant. At one point he challenges him to a duel and the giant starts pacing off into the distance and is soon over the horizon. Bugs' self-congratulations ("You know, I'm so smart, sometimes it almost frightens me") is short-lived, as the giant comes toward him from the other horizon.

Finally, the giant accidentally falls from his sky-borne realm and crashes into the ground, making a huge giant-shaped hole. Instead of being dead, the hard-headed giant simply sits up, dizzy, and invokes a well-known comic catchphrase, "Duh, watch out for dat foist step - it's a lulu!".

See also
Looney Tunes and Merrie Melodies filmography (1940–1949)
List of Bugs Bunny cartoons

Sources

References

External links 
 Jack-Wabbit and the Beanstalk on the Internet Archive
 

1943 films
1943 short films
1943 animated films
1940s animated short films
Films based on Jack and the Beanstalk
Short films directed by Friz Freleng
Merrie Melodies short films
Warner Bros. Cartoons animated short films
American parody films
Fairy tale parody films
Films scored by Carl Stalling
Films produced by Leon Schlesinger
Bugs Bunny films
Films with screenplays by Michael Maltese
1940s Warner Bros. animated short films